Patrick Jovanovic (born 17 December 1973 as Prvoslav Jovanovic) is an Austrian football manager and former player who played as a defender. He is an assistant manager of SK Rapid Wien II.

References

External links
 

1973 births
Living people
Association football defenders
Austrian footballers
Austrian Football Bundesliga players
SK Rapid Wien players
Favoritner AC players
SC Austria Lustenau players
FC Kärnten players
SC-ESV Parndorf 1919 players
Kremser SC players
SV Horn players
Austria under-21 international footballers
Austrian football managers
Austrian people of Serbian descent